Delaware Valley Classical School is a private, K-12 classical Christian school located in New Castle, Delaware. Prior to the 2019–20 academic year, enrollment was approximately 175 students, with approximately 30 faculty and staff.

History
The school was founded as Christ Classical Christian School in 1994 by a group of homeschooling parents from Elkton, Maryland, taking inspiration from Douglas Wilson's book, Recovering the Lost Tools of Learning. In its first year, 23 students were enrolled. It relocated to Newark in 1995, to Hockessin in 1997, adopting the name Tall Oaks Classical School. In 2001, Donald Post became the school's second headmaster, and in 2006 moved to the Faith City Family Church building in Christiana. In 2010, the school moved to First Baptist Church in New Castle, Delaware, formerly occupied by New Castle Christian Academy. The school's third headmaster, Timothy Dernlan, took over in 2014, after serving one year as the upper school principal. In 2016, the school moved to the Red Lion campus, which they shared with Red Lion Christian Academy in a partnership with Reach Church's Reach Christian Schools. Under Reach's acquisition of Tall Oaks, athletics and other after-school activities were merged with Red Lion's programs.

In 2019, the school reorganized under the new name Delaware Valley Classical School and announced they would be starting in September 2019 back at the New Castle campus under the leadership of Anthony Urti as headmaster.

Curriculum 
In accordance with the classical tradition, the school divides education into three stages of learning: grammar (grades K-5), logic (grades 6–8), and rhetoric (grades 9–12). Latin instruction begins in the third grade, followed by Greek and Spanish in the upper grades. Art and music are also part of the core curriculum for all grades. The logic and rhetoric stages culminate in the preparation, presentation, and defense of a formal thesis. DVCS students have the opportunity to earn several college credits before graduation through a dual enrollment program with Cairn University. There are also elective opportunities for computer science, vocal ensemble, journalism, debate, mock trial, and art.

Extracurricular activities

Athletics 
DVCS athletics has varsity and middle school programs for basketball, cross country, soccer, and volleyball, along with varsity baseball. They compete as the Titans in the Mid-Atlantic Independent League (MIL). At the 2021 MIL League Championship, girls cross country runners took 2nd and 3rd place. In 2015, the volleyball team and both cross-country teams earned 2nd place in the conference, with Titan runners sweeping all four champion spots (varsity and middle school, boys and girls).

Arts and science 
During their partnership on the Red Lion campus, Tall Oaks students earned lead roles in productions of the musicals The Wizard of Oz, The Pirates of Penzance, and Newsies. In January 2020, DVCS staged its first musical production, Willy Wonka, and followed it up in February 2022 with Annie. In 2023, they will return to the stage with Disney's Beauty and the Beast. Students also have opportunities to compete in the Delaware Secondary School Mathematics League and Delaware Science Olympiad.

Awards and recognition 
Tall Oaks (the predecessor organization) was a charter member and accredited school of the Association of Classical and Christian Schools (ACCS), one of the first 30 to earn that distinction. Delaware Valley Classical School was also granted full accreditation in its inaugural year. Students take the Classic Learning Test, an alternative standardized test comparable to the SAT or ACT college admission test, which assesses English, mathematical, and critical reasoning skills. Based on the median scores from the 2019–2020 school year, DVCS eleventh and twelfth graders ranked 3rd nationally. For the 2021 CLT8 test, DVCS seventh and eighth graders were ranked 3rd, and ninth and tenth graders were ranked 20th.

Students in grades three through eight participate in the National Mythology Exam sponsored by Excellence Through Classics, and in 2016, the sixth grade had 16 medalists, including seven gold, six silver, and three bronze. Students Kelly Weber, Phoebe Hu, and Sarah Chaffee represented Tall Oaks by earning first prize in the ACCS Chrysostom Oratory Competition in successive years from 2011–13, and in 2017, Kana Turley became the fourth Tall Oaks student to earn first prize in the competition. In 2017, Tall Oaks student Nick Yu earned a perfect score and a 3rd place finish in the Delaware Secondary School Mathematics League Invitational Meet. Also in 2017, Tall Oaks freshman Sam McGarvey was the second runner-up in the Poetry Out Loud State Competition, and went on to win the state title his sophomore year in 2018. He followed up in 2019 by taking the first runner-up spot his junior year, and then shared the stage his senior year with classmate Sarah Zhu, formerly of Tall Oaks, who took first runner-up in the 2020 state finals. The school was represented in 2021 by freshman Janelle Carter who was the state's second runner-up, and in 2022 by junior Kai Schmiedel who was the first runner-up. In March 2021, sixth-grader Sophia Dorno placed 3rd in the Delaware State Spelling Bee.

Science Olympiad 
The middle school Science Olympiad team took 2nd place overall for the 2018 state competition, with 1st place finishes in two events and 2nd place in another four. Both the middle school and high school teams earned 5th place overall in the 2019 competition, and the high school team returned in 2020 to earn 6th place (the middle school competition was canceled due to the COVID-19 pandemic).  In 2022, the middle school Science Olympiad team once again took 2nd place overall in the state, with 1st place finishes in four events and top 5 in eight others. The high school team earned 1st place in one event, and top 5 in four others.

See also
Association of Classical and Christian Schools
Classical Christian Education

References

External links

Christian schools in Delaware
Classical Christian schools
Educational institutions established in 1994
High schools in New Castle County, Delaware
Private elementary schools in Delaware
Private high schools in Delaware
Private middle schools in Delaware
1994 establishments in Delaware